Anthony "Buddy" Lee (born May 10, 1958) is an American wrestler. He competed in the men's Greco-Roman 62 kg at the 1992 Summer Olympics.

References

1958 births
Living people
American male sport wrestlers
Olympic wrestlers of the United States
Wrestlers at the 1992 Summer Olympics
Sportspeople from Birmingham, Alabama